The Durham Bulls are a Minor League Baseball team of the International League and the Triple-A affiliate of the Tampa Bay Rays. They are located in Durham, North Carolina, and play their home games at Durham Bulls Athletic Park, which opened in 1995.

Established as the Durham Tobacconists in the North Carolina League in 1902, the team subsequently disbanded and restarted numerous times. After a 10-year hiatus, it was reestablished as the Durham Bulls and played in the North Carolina State League from 1913 to 1917. The Bulls were members of the Piedmont League from 1920 to 1933 and for a second time from 1936 to 1943. Durham competed in the Carolina League from 1945 to 1971. For the latter part of this stretch, they merged with a team from Raleigh, becoming the Raleigh-Durham Mets (1968), Raleigh-Durham Phillies (1969), and Raleigh-Durham Triangles (1970–1971). The Durham Bulls returned as members of the Carolina League in 1980. They were replaced by an International League team in 1998. In conjunction with Major League Baseball's (MLB) reorganization of the minors in 2021, they were placed in the Triple-A East, but this was renamed the International League in 2022.

Durham has won 17 league championships. They won the Piedmont League championship six times (1922, 1924, 1925, 1930, 1940, and 1941). Though not affiliated with any MLB team for the first four, the Bulls were a farm club for the Cincinnati Reds and Brooklyn Dodgers, respectively, for the last two. They won the Carolina League championship on three occasions: in 1957 with the Detroit Tigers, 1967 with the New York Mets, and 1969 with the Philadelphia Phillies. The Bulls have won the International League championship eight times (2002, 2003, 2009, 2013, 2017, 2018, 2021, and 2022), all as an affiliate of the Tampa Bay Rays. Durham has gone on to win three Triple-A National Championship Games (2009, 2017, and 2022).

The 1988 film Bull Durham, starring Kevin Costner, Tim Robbins, and Susan Sarandon, featured the Bulls and Durham Athletic Park, the team's stadium at the time. Most of the filming was done at the ballpark following the end of the 1987 season.

History

Early years (1902–1926)
The Bulls were founded in 1902 as the Durham Tobacconists. The official date when the franchise formed was March 18. William G. Bramham, later President of the National Association of Professional Baseball Leagues (Minor League Baseball), was the first owner. The Tobacconists took the field for the first time on April 24 in an exhibition game against Trinity College. Their first game in the North Carolina League was at Charlotte on May 5 against the Hornets, and their first home game was against the New Bern Truckers on May 12. The league, however, folded in July, not having played a full season.

In December 1912, the Durham Tobacconists re-formed as the Durham Bulls in the North Carolina State League. Their first game was on April 24, 1913, at Hanes Field on the Trinity College campus (now the East Campus of Duke University). They defeated the Raleigh Capitals 7-4. On May 30, 1917, however, the North Carolina State League folded due to America's joining of the Allied Powers during World War I. The Bulls were declared league champions, even though the season was shortened to only 36 games.

On October 31, 1919, the Bulls joined the Piedmont League, a minor league with clubs scattered around Virginia and North Carolina. Seven years later, in 1926, the team moved from Hanes Field to El Toro Park. The park was dedicated on July 26 by the Commissioner of Baseball Kenesaw Mountain Landis, who put on a show by riding a real bull, the team mascot, onto the playing field.

Durham Athletic Park and the Carolina League (1932–1957)
Six years later, in 1932, the team became affiliated with the National League's Philadelphia Phillies, the first of ten teams that the Bulls have been affiliated with. The next year, the city of Durham purchased El Toro Park, renaming it the Durham Athletic Park after the 1933 season. The Bulls were unable to operate for the 1934 and 1935 seasons due to the Great Depression. Meanwhile, a team from Wilmington, North Carolina who also played in the Piedmont League and was a Cincinnati Reds affiliate called the Wilmington Pirates relocated to Durham and was going to replace the Bulls. The Bulls franchise, however, was re-activated by having the operations of the Wilmington ball club integrated into the Bulls. The Reds then switched affiliations from the former Wilmington ball club to the Bulls and the Bulls continued as the same franchise. On the evening of June 17, 1939, the Durham Athletic Park burned to the ground hours after the Bulls defeated the Portsmouth Cubs 7-3. The groundskeeper, Walter Williams, who was asleep under the grandstand when the blaze began, was able to escape though the fire nearly killed him. Damage costs were more than $100,000. In a remarkable two-week turnaround, Durham Athletic Park was functioning again by July 2, with the old wooden grandstand replaced by concrete and steel.  Temporary bleachers were also added and seated 1,000. The crowd that day saw the Bulls beat the Charlotte Hornets 11-4.

A new Durham Athletic Park was finally completed in April 1940, in time for an exhibition game between the Cincinnati Reds and Boston Red Sox, which attracted 5,574 fans. Only 1,587 turned out ten days later for the Bulls' first game of the season. On September 5, 1943, the last-place Bulls played their last Piedmont League game, beating Richmond 15-5. The following year, the Piedmont League became an all-Virginia league, and there was no baseball in Durham in 1944.
In 1945, a second Carolina League formed. On April 27 the reactivated Bulls played their first game in the new league, defeating the Burlington Bees 5-0. Three years later, in September 1948, Tom Wright, a former Bulls outfielder, became the first Carolina League player to make it to the majors when he debuted with the Boston Red Sox. Three years after that, the Bulls helped make history when their 5-4 loss to the Danville Leafs featured the first black player in Carolina League history, Percy Miller Jr., who played for the Leafs. It would not be until April 18, 1957, that the Bulls fielded African-American players, when third baseman Bubba Morton and pitcher Ted Richardson took the field in a loss to Greensboro. That season also saw the first Carolina League All-Star game played in Durham.

Raleigh-Durham era (1967–1980)
In 1967, the Bulls became a New York Mets affiliate. One year later, the Bulls were renamed the Raleigh-Durham Mets. The franchise was renamed because the Bulls acquired the nearby Raleigh Pirates and merged with them. The team still maintained their affiliation with the Mets, playing half of their home games at Durham Athletic Park and half at Devereaux Meadow in Raleigh. The team switched affiliations from the Mets to the Philadelphia Phillies and were renamed the Raleigh-Durham Phillies for the 1969 season. The team hadn't been affiliated with the Phillies since the 1932 season. The Phillies abandoned the franchise and the team became independent, renaming themselves the Raleigh-Durham Triangles for the 1970 season. The team played as the Triangles from 1970–1971 and remained independent for both seasons. The franchise disbanded again before the 1972 season, and baseball would not return to Durham until 1980. Also, minor league baseball in Raleigh ended for good. 
For the 1980 season, the Raleigh-Durham Triangles were reformed and renamed back to the Durham Bulls. On June 22 of that same year, the local CBS affiliate, then WTVD in Durham, broadcast the Bulls game locally, the first time that the Bulls had ever been featured on television. The team also became an affiliate of the Atlanta Braves that season and would remain so until 1998.

The Bull Durham years (1988–1994) 
Team owner Miles Wolff began pushing for a new ballpark for the Bulls in 1988 in order to attract Triple-A baseball, but stadium plans were pushed back for years. When the film Bull Durham was released in mid-1988, it led to a major resurgence of local popular interest in the team and their ballpark. Both the real Bulls and their movie counterparts played in the High-A Carolina League in the late 1980s. On August 30, 1990, a crowd of 6,202 made the Bulls the first Class-A team in history to pass the 300,000 mark in attendance for a season.

The Bulls were sold to the Raleigh-based Capitol Broadcasting Company in 1991. Capitol president Jim Goodmon initially proposed building the new stadium near Raleigh-Durham International Airport, but after city leaders in Durham offered to renovate the old ballpark or help build a new stadium, the current downtown Durham site was secured. In July 1992, the Bulls unveiled their current mascot, Wool E. Bull, a moniker submitted by Durham resident Jim Vickery out of a pool of 500, inspired by the otherwise unrelated novelty song oldie, "Wooly Bully". The "E" in his name stands for "education." The next June, the Bulls retired the number 18 belonging to Joe Morgan, the first hall of famer to play for the Bulls, who was a member of the 1963 club (Chipper Jones, who played for the Bulls in 1992, was the second, elected in 2018). Morgan's number remained the only one retired by the club for many years; he attended the ceremony where his number was retired. The team also retained the snorting bull sign that was used in Bull Durham and it remained at Durham Athletic Park until both team and sign left after the 1994 season.

DBAP and Triple-A baseball (1995–2003)
Durham Bulls Athletic Park opened its doors in 1995, complete with a new snorting bull sign. The 1997 season was the final one in which the Bulls were an affiliate of the Atlanta Braves and also their last year in the High-A Carolina League. In 1998, the franchise moved two levels up to Triple-A and joined the International League (IL), in part because of their popularity as the main team in Bull Durham, and also because the Triple-A leagues needed two more teams to accommodate affiliates for the Major League Baseball expansion teams Tampa Bay Devil Rays and Arizona Diamondbacks. Wolff's dream of attracting Triple-A baseball came true when the Bulls became the Triple-A affiliate of the Tampa Bay Devil Rays (now Tampa Bay Rays), who have remained their parent club ever since. DBAP expanded its seating capacity due to the move. 1998 also saw the Bulls play their first game outside the United States when they played road games against the Ottawa Lynx (now the Lehigh Valley IronPigs), though it would be another year before they recorded their first win in Canada.

The Bulls' second appearance on film was in The Rookie, released in 2002. It starred Dennis Quaid as Jim Morris, a baseball pitcher who is now retired. The real Jim Morris did play for the Bulls briefly during the 1999 season and was then called up to the major leagues on September 18, 1999, at the age of 35. He made his debut against Royce Clayton of the Texas Rangers, striking him out on four pitches. Morris made four more appearances later that year.
The 2001 season saw the Bulls set single-game (10,916 on July 23) and full-season (505,319 set on September 1) attendance records. The Bulls celebrated their 100th anniversary season in 2002. On September 12, 2002, the Bulls won their first IL championship, defeating the Buffalo Bisons 2-0 for the Governors' Cup. In 2003, Durham became the first club in the 119-year history of the championship to sweep back-to-back final playoff series, defeating the Pawtucket Red Sox.

Championships and success (2005–2015)
After missing the playoffs for the 2005 and 2006 seasons, the Bulls captured the 2007 South Division title with an 80-64 regular season record. Durham defeated the Toledo Mud Hens in a three-game sweep during the first round of the playoffs, but were defeated three games to two in the Governors' Cup Final by the Richmond Braves (now Gwinnett Braves). 2007 was also the first season of Charlie Montoyo as Bulls manager, replacing Bill Evers. In 2008, with a record of 74-70 the Bulls would once again win the South Division. After defeating the Louisville Bats three games to one in the first round, the Bulls again lost the championship, this time in four games to the Scranton/Wilkes-Barre Yankees.

In 2009, they won the division for a third consecutive season with an 83-61 record. Facing the Louisville Bats in the first round again, the Bulls were victorious, winning in five games. The third time was the charm for the Bulls in the Governors' Cup final, as they dethroned the Scranton/Wilkes-Barre Yankees in three games to win the championship, their third since joining the International League. The Bulls advanced to the Triple-A Baseball National Championship Game against the champions of the Pacific Coast League for the first time in team history, as that championship game did not exist at the time of the Bulls' previous two Governors' Cup championships. Facing the Memphis Redbirds, the Bulls would win their first class championship, scoring the winning run on a wild pitch in the bottom half of the 11th inning. Also in 2009, the Bulls retired the number 8 of Crash Davis, the main character of Bull Durham, which was their first number retirement in 16 years.

On August 19, 2010, the Bulls won their fourth straight division championship. Almost two weeks later, the Bulls set the Triple-A wins record winning their 84th game of the 2010 season. On August 2, 2011, the Bulls defeated the Charlotte Knights, the Chicago White Sox affiliate, 18-3 for their 6,000th win in franchise history. The team retired the number 20 of longtime general manager Bill Evers the following year. In 2013, the team won its fourth Governors' Cup title, defeating the Pawtucket Red Sox in the International League Final. The same year the number 10, belonging to former Bulls player Chipper Jones, was retired. Following a $20 million renovation to the DBAP, the Bulls hosted the 27th Triple-A All-Star Game on July 16, 2014, which saw the International League prevail 7-3 over the Pacific Coast League. Montoyo became the franchise's all-time winningest manager on July 21, earning his 614th victory to pass Evers. On August 31, 2014, the Bulls again broke their all-time paid attendance record, finishing the year with a cumulative mark of 533,033.

Changes and a second championship (2015–2019)
Before the 2015 season, Jared Sandberg was named the fourth manager in the team's Triple-A history, replacing Montoyo. The 2015 season saw the Bulls set both a new single-game paid attendance record on July 4, and a new single-season paid attendance record, finishing with a cumulative mark of 554,788. In 2016, the Bulls had the franchise's second-highest attendance numbers and retired Montoyo's number 25. Overall, the team had their fourth losing season since 1998 and missed the playoffs. 
2017 proved a watershed year for the Bulls, as they captured their first South Division championship since 2014 with an 86-56 record. The Bulls then won their second Triple-A National Championship, defeating the Memphis Redbirds after beating the Scranton/Wilkes-Barre RailRiders for their fifth Governors' Cup title. Success continued in 2018; the team went 79-60 and won their second straight South Division championship and Governor's Cup before falling to Memphis in the National Championship.

Sandberg left before the 2019 season for a position with the Seattle Mariners. The Bulls hired Brady Williams as their 5th Triple-A manager. The team finished 2019 with a 75-64 record, making the playoffs as a wild card, and advanced to the Governor's Cup before losing to Columbus. After the season, Baseball America named the Bulls the most successful MiLB franchise of the 2010s.

Lost season, reorganization, and more championships (2020–present) 

As a consequence of the worldwide onset of the COVID-19 pandemic, Minor League Baseball announced on June 30, 2020, that no season would be held, meaning that the Durham Bulls would not take the field again until the following spring.

In conjunction with Major League Baseball's restructuring of Minor League Baseball in 2021, the Bulls were organized into the Triple-A East. In their first season in the league, the Bulls claimed the Triple-A East's championship with a 77–43 record. After the conclusion of the regular season, 10 games that had been postponed from the start of the season were reinserted into the schedule as a postseason tournament called the Triple-A Final Stretch in which all 30 Triple-A clubs competed for the highest winning percentage. Durham won the tournament with a 9–1 record. In 2022, the Triple-A East became known as the International League, the name historically used by the regional circuit prior to the 2021 reorganization, which the Bulls had been members of since their move up to Triple-A.

Manager Brady Williams led the 2022 Bulls to win the Eastern Division title with a 86–64 record. They then defeated the Nashville Sounds, winners of the Western Division, in a single playoff game, 13–0, to win the IL championship. Durham faced the Reno Aces for the Triple-A championship, winning 10–6.

Season-by-season records

Radio and television

All Bulls home and road games are broadcast on 96.5 FM Buzz Sports Radio. Live audio broadcasts are also available online through the team's website and the MiLB First Pitch app. Select home games are televised on Me-TV 50.2, and all home games are broadcast by WRAL Sports+. All home and road games can be viewed through the MiLB.TV subscription feature of the official website of Minor League Baseball, with audio provided by a radio simulcast.

Former play-by-play announcers include Gary Cohen, who was the Voice of the Bulls in 1986 and became part of the New York Mets' broadcast team in 1989, and Neil Solondz, who was with Durham from 2004 to 2011 before being hired by the Tampa Bay Rays. Patrick Kinas has been the announcer since 2012.

Broadcasts are produced by members of Explorer Post 50, a youth-based group for students who have completed middle school and are 14 to 20 years old. The program provides youth with hands-on experience in television production.

Current Roster

Achievements

Awards 

These honors have been awarded to the franchise or its personnel by Minor League Baseball.

Four players, eight managers, and one executive won league awards in recognition for their performance with Durham in the Carolina League.

Ten players, two managers, and two executives have won league awards in recognition for their performance with Durham in the International League.

Retired numbers

The Bulls have honored five individuals by retiring their uniform numbers. This ensures that the number will be associated with one player of particular importance to the team. An additional number (42) was retired across professional baseball to honor Jackie Robinson, the first African American to play in Major League Baseball in the modern era.

Notes

References
Specific

General

External links

Statistics from Baseball-Reference

 
1902 establishments in North Carolina
Atlanta Braves minor league affiliates
Baseball teams established in 1902
Boston Red Sox minor league affiliates
Brooklyn Dodgers minor league affiliates
Capitol Broadcasting Company
Carolina League teams
Cincinnati Reds minor league affiliates
Detroit Tigers minor league affiliates
Houston Astros minor league affiliates
Houston Colt .45s minor league affiliates
International League teams
New York Mets minor league affiliates
New York Yankees minor league affiliates
Philadelphia Phillies minor league affiliates
Piedmont League teams
Professional baseball teams in North Carolina
Sports in Durham, North Carolina
Tampa Bay Devil Rays minor league affiliates
Tampa Bay Rays minor league affiliates
Triple-A East teams